De brutas, nada is a Mexican comedy-drama television series produced by Sony Pictures Television, based on a screenplay by Isabella Santodomingo. The series stars Tessa Ía and Christian Vázquez, with an ensemble cast composed mostly by Marimar Vega, José Pablo Minor, Carolina Ramírez, and Julián Román. The first season of the series premiered on 6 November 2020 on Amazon Prime Video. The second season was released on 15 January 2021. The third season premiered on 18 January 2023.

Plot 
The plot revolves around Cristina (Tessa Ía), a young woman who is about to marry, but suddenly discovers that her fiancé cheated on her with another woman. Now living alone in her apartment, Cristina decides to undertake a search for a new roomie. Alejandro (Christian Vázquez) is a single man who is looking for a new place to live and meets Cristina, who he suddenly falls in love with, but out of fear he decides to make her believe he is gay.

Cast

Main 
 Tessa Ía as Cristina Oviedo
 Christian Vázquez as Alejandro Montero
 Marimar Vega as Esther Duarte
 José Pablo Minor as Rodrigo Alberto Flores
 Carolina Ramírez as Hannah Larrea
 Oswaldo Zárate as Miguel Sánchez
 Julián Román as Guillermo Roble
 Diana Bovio as Graciela Oviedo

Guest stars 
 Gonzalo García Vivanco as Eduardo
 Carmenza González as Doña Martha (Martita)

Episodes

Series overview

Season 1 (2020)

Season 2 (2021)

Season 3 (2023)

Production 
The filming of the series began on 5 September 2019, and consists of two seasons, the first season having a total of 9 episodes and the second a total of 11 episodes. Filming of the third season began in September 2021.

References

External links 
 

Spanish-language television shows
Sony Pictures Television telenovelas
2020 Mexican television series debuts
2020s comedy-drama television series